Andakombe Airport  is an airport in Andakombe, Papua New Guinea.

References

Airports in Papua New Guinea